Lagunilla del Jubera is a municipality in the autonomous community of La Rioja, northern Spain, located in the Jubera River valley 19 kilometers (12 miles) from the capital, Logroño. The town has a Mediterranean climate, with hot dry summers and cold winters. Although agriculture has declined in the area, grains and grapes are still grown and livestock raised on a small scale.

References

Municipalities in La Rioja (Spain)